Christian Paoletti (born 12 December 1984) is an Italian footballer. He plays as a goalkeeper.

External links
 Christian Paoletti's profile on Cisco Roma's official website

1984 births
Living people
Footballers from Florence
Italian footballers
A.C. Sansovino players
A.S.D. Cassino Calcio 1924 players

Association football goalkeepers